Legionella drozanskii is a Gram-negative, catalase-positive, oxidase-negative bacterium from the genus Legionella which was isolated from tank well water in Leeds in England.

References

External links
Type strain of Legionella drozanskii at BacDive -  the Bacterial Diversity Metadatabase

Legionellales
Bacteria described in 2001